Canoeing at the 2004 Summer Olympics was held at the Schinias Olympic Rowing and Canoeing Centre for the sprint events and the Olympic Canoe/Kayak Slalom Centre at the Helliniko Olympic Complex for the canoe and kayak slalom disciplines. A total of 16 events were contested, 12 sprint events (9 for men and 3 for women) and 4 slalom events (3 for men and 1 for women).

Medal summary

By event

Slalom

Sprint
Men

Women

By nation

References
2004 Summer Olympics official report Volume 2. pp. 284–92.

External links
Official result book – Canoe / Kayak Flatwater Racing
Official result book – Canoe / Kayak Slalom Racing

 
2004 Summer Olympics events
2004
Olympics
Canoeing in Greece